Drangedal is a municipality in Vestfold og Telemark county, Norway.  It is part of the traditional region of Grenland.  The administrative centre of the municipality is the village of Prestestranda.  The municipality of Drangedal was established on 1 January 1838 (see formannskapsdistrikt).  The district of Tørdal encompassed the northwestern part of the municipality.

The administrative centre in Drangedal, Prestestranda, and is situated by Lake Toke. The municipal government is located there along with primary and secondary schools, shopping facilities, and a bank. Drangedal railway station is also located in Prestestranda and is served by the Oslo to Kristiansand Sørlandsbannen railway line. The newspaper Drangedalsposten is published in Drangedal.

Alpine and cross-country skiing is possible in the area of Drangedal, at Telemark's largest ski resort at Gautefall.

Name
The Old Norse form of the name was Drangadalr. The first element is probably the genitive plural of drangr m 'mountain peak'. The last element is dalr m 'valley, dale'.

History
The Kragerø Line ceased in 1989.

Coat-of-arms
The coat-of-arms is from modern times.  They were granted 1989. The arms show two gold-colored pine cones on a green background.

Notable natives 
 Hallvard Graatop (early 15th century), rebel leader opposing the Crown and the bailiffs, may have lived at the Vraalstad farm in Drangedal 
 Andrew Gulickson (1856 in Drangedal – 1941) Norwegian American politician, member of Wisconsin State Assembly
 Knud Wefald (1869 in Yttre Vefald – 1936) Norwegian American politician in the United States House of Representatives 
 Abraham Aakre (1874 in Drangedal – 1948) a Norwegian teacher and politician, Mayor of Halden
 Finn Støren (1893–1962) a Norwegian civil servant for Nasjonal Samling, lived in Drangedal from 1933
 Knut T. Storbukås (born 1943 in Bostrak) a musician and truck driver, stage name Sputnik
 Nils Tore Føreland (born 1957) a Norwegian politician, Mayor of Drangedal 2003-2011
 Vidar Sundstøl (born 1963) a Norwegian crime fiction writer.

Gallery

References

External links

Municipal fact sheet from Statistics Norway

 
Municipalities of Vestfold og Telemark